On 30 May 1876, a government coup occurred in the Ottoman capital of Istanbul, which resulted in the dethronement of the Ottoman Sultan Abdulaziz, and subsequently, the appointment of Murad V as the Sultan.

Background 
In the last period of Abdulaziz's reign, the economic situation was getting worse. In 1875, uprisings against the Ottoman Empire broke out in Serbia, the Aegean Islands, Egypt, Montenegro, Romania and Bosnia-Herzegovina. The Bulgarian Revolts, which broke out in the Panagurishte region in April 1876, spread to the entire Sredna Gora region. Around 1,000 Muslim people living in the region were killed by the rebellious Bulgarians. As a result, reciprocal massacres took place between Bulgarians and Caucasian Muslims, such as Circassians and Abazas, who were expelled from the Caucasus by the Russian Empire and forced to migrate to the region. These massacres were evaluated as if they were committed against the Bulgarians unilaterally in Europe, causing a negative atmosphere around the Ottoman Empire.

Thereupon, the European countries' various interventions against the Ottoman Empire created discomfort among the Ottoman people. On May 9, 1876, students in the Fatih district of Istanbul protested. The number of demonstrators reached 5,000 in a short time. On 12 May, Grand Vizier Mahmut Nedim Pasha was dismissed and Mehmed Rüşdi Pasha came in his place. In addition, Hasan Hayrullah Efendi became the sheikh al-Islam instead of Hasan Fehmi Efendi. Hüseyin Avni Pasha was also made a serasker. But the demonstrations did not end. On 17 May, demonstrations were held again in Fatih and in Beyazıt squares.

Coup and aftermath 

One day before the coup, on May 29, 1876, the head of the Young Ottoman secret society, Midhat Pasha, serasker Hüseyin Avni Pasha, War School Minister Süleyman Pasha, Council of Military Chief Ahmed Pasha received a fatwa from the new Şeyhülislam Hasan Hayrullah Efendi for the removal of the Sultan. Everything was ready for the coup to take place the next day.

On 30 May, the students of the Military Academy took action under the command of Süleyman Pasha, and the soldiers in the Taşkışla and Gümüşsuyu barracks were under the command of the Istanbul army commander, Refik Pasha. Madrasah students also joined the soldiers. Dolmabahçe Palace was surrounded. Abdulaziz, who was dethroned, was removed from the palace in a boat. In his place, Murad V was declared the Ottoman Sultan.

The ousted sultan, who was detained in Feriye Palace, was found dead on 4 June with his wrists slit. Neşerek Kadın Efendi, one of Abdülaziz's wives, passed away on 11 June. Neşerek Hanım's brother, Circassian Hasan, who held these state officials responsible for the events that dethroned Abdülaziz, went to Midhat Pasha's mansion on 15 June 1876 and raided a government meeting. He killed Serasker Hüseyin Avni Pasha and Foreign Minister Mehmed Raşid Pasha. He also chased Midhat and Ahmed Pashas to kill them. 5 people were murdered until Circassian Hasan was caught. After this incident, the mental health of Sultan Murad V, who was already depressed, got worse. On August 31, a fatwa was taken from the sheikh al-Islam again, and he was dethroned and replaced by Abdul Hamid II.

Additional reading 

 Yılmaz Öztuna, Bir Darbenin Anatomisi, Babıali Kültür Yayınları; ISBN 975-8486-46-2; İstanbul 2003

References 

1876 in the Ottoman Empire
Military coups in the Ottoman Empire
Rebellions against the Ottoman Empire
Rebellions against empires